Joachim Barrande (11 August 1799 – 5 October 1883) was a French geologist and palaeontologist.

Career

Barrande was born at Saugues, Haute Loire, and educated in the École Polytechnique and École Nationale des Ponts et Chaussées at Paris. Although he had received the training of an engineer, his first appointment was that of tutor to the duc de Bordeaux (afterwards known as the comte de Chambord), grandson of Charles X, and when the king abdicated in 1830, Barrande accompanied the royal exiles to England and Scotland, and afterwards to Prague. Settling in that city in 1831, he became occupied in engineering works, and his attention was then attracted to the fossils from the Lower Palaeozoic rocks of Bohemia.

The publication in 1839 of Murchison's Silurian System incited Barrande to carry on systematic researches on the equivalent strata in Bohemia. For ten years (1840–1850) he made a detailed study of these rocks, engaging workmen specially to collect fossils, and in this way he obtained upwards of 3500 species of graptolites, brachiopoda, mollusca, trilobites and fishes. The first volume of his great work, Système silurien du centre de la Bohême (dealing with trilobites, several genera, including Deiphon, which he personally described), appeared in 1852; and from that date until 1881, he issued twenty-one quarto volumes of text and plates. Two other volumes were issued after his death in 1887 and 1894. It is estimated that he spent nearly £10,000 on these works. In addition he published a large number of separate papers.

In recognition of his important researches the Geological Society of London in 1857 awarded to him the Wollaston medal. In 1862, he was elected as a member to the American Philosophical Society. In 1870, he was elected a foreign member of the Royal Swedish Academy of Sciences. He was elected a Foreign Honorary Member of the American Academy of Arts and Sciences in 1875.

Barrande died at Frohsdorf on 5 October 1883. His extensive collection has been stored in National Museum in Prague on grounds of his testament.

In 1884 the Barrande Rocks in Prague was named in honor of the scientist and massive plaque with Barrande's name was added at the rocks. On 24 February 1928, a district of Prague, Barrandov, was named after him.

Opposition to evolution

Barrande was an advocate of the theory of catastrophes (as taught by Georges Cuvier).  He later opposed Charles Darwin's theory of evolution. He rejected transmutation of species. He also wrote a five-volume book on the defense of his theory of so-called "colonies", presuming that the cause of the presence of fossils typical for one layer surrounded by those typical for another is atectonical. He tended to name those colonies with names of his scientific adversaries.

His anti-evolutionary views were criticized by geologist Henry Hicks who commented that "Barrande is well known to be a determined opponent to the theory of evolution, and doubtless this strong bias has prevented him from seeing and accepting many facts which would otherwise, to so keen and careful an observer, have seemed inconsistent with such strong views."

References

Further reading

Jiří Kříž, John Pojeta, Jr. and Barrande. (1974). Barrande's Colonies Concept and a Comparison of His Stratigraphy with the Modern Stratigraphy of the Middle Bohemian Lower Paleozoic Rocks (Barrandian) of Czechoslovakia. Journal of Paleontology 48 (3): 489–494.

External links

 Detailed biography
 Detailed biography (in Czech, with details of his stay in Bohemia)
 
 part of his collection accessible online via Europeana
 Works by Joachim Barrande accessible online via Kramerius (digital library)
 Système silurien du centre de la Bohême accessible online via Kramerius (digital library)

1799 births
1883 deaths
19th-century French people
19th-century Czech people
Catastrophism
Czech paleontologists
Czech geologists
French geologists
French paleontologists
Paleobotanists
Members of the Royal Swedish Academy of Sciences
Fellows of the American Academy of Arts and Sciences
Foreign associates of the National Academy of Sciences
Corresponding members of the Saint Petersburg Academy of Sciences
Wollaston Medal winners
École Polytechnique alumni
Czech people of French descent
People from Haute-Loire
Members of the Göttingen Academy of Sciences and Humanities